The 1978 Milan–San Remo was the 69th edition of the Milan–San Remo cycle race and was held on 18 March 1978. The race started in Milan and finished in San Remo. The race was won by Roger De Vlaeminck of the Sanson team.

General classification

References

1978
1978 in road cycling
1978 in Italian sport
1978 Super Prestige Pernod